7x7 was a city-living-focused fashion, lifestyle, food, culture, opinion and entertainment digital, print, mobile, social, commerce and events activation platform, covering the San Francisco Bay Area, USA. Included in coverage were San Francisco, Marin, the  East Bay and highlights from the Peninsula; the Bay Area wine regions including Napa and Sonoma counties, as well as Lodi and Livermore; the Lake Tahoe region; notable attractions along Highway 1; and Los Angeles. Since, March 2015, it has been publishing only through digital platforms.

History and profile
7x7 was founded in 2001 by Tom Hartle and Heather Hartle, who had just moved from Detroit.  The name, pronounced "seven-by-seven", originally represented the approximate forty-nine square miles making up the City and County of San Francisco. 7x7 was produced by McEvoy Media, which is owned by the McEvoy Group.

In 2004, McEvoy Media, then Hartle Media, acquired a majority interest in California Home + Design and californiahomedesign.com. In 2006, it was involved in the purchase of Spin by the McEvoy Group, owners of Chronicle Books.

7x7 was acquired by Metropolitan Media in 2014, and later acquired by its current owner, 7x7 Bay Area, Inc. 'It ceased print publication with its March 2015 issue and refocused its efforts on its digital platforms.

See also 
 David Weir, 7x7'''s founding editor
 San Francisco'' magazine

References

External links
 7x7 San Francisco home page

Defunct magazines published in the United States
Lifestyle magazines published in the United States
Local interest magazines published in the United States
Magazines established in 2001
Magazines disestablished in 2015
Magazines published in San Francisco
Monthly magazines published in the United States